Lalariya is a village in the Bhopal district of Madhya Pradesh, India. It is located in the Berasia tehsil.

Demographics 

According to the 2011 census of India, Lalariya has 1292 households. The effective literacy rate (i.e. the literacy rate of population excluding children aged 6 and below) is 61.61%.

References the village city of lalariya 

Villages in Berasia tehsil